Abbos Otakhonov (Abbos Otaxonov; born 25 August 1995) is an Uzbekistani footballer who plays as a defender for Metallurg Bekabad in Uzbekistan Super League and Uzbekistan national football team.

References

External links
 
 

1995 births
Living people
Uzbekistani expatriate footballers
Uzbekistan international footballers
Uzbekistan Super League players
Association football defenders
Pakhtakor Tashkent FK players
Uzbekistani footballers